Gurdial Singh Phul (1911 20 October 1989)  is an Indian Punjabi dramatist.

Education
Born of humble parents in 1911, Phul began his academic career by passing his matriculation from Doaba High School Jalandhar in 1927. He did his graduation in 1931, and then his master's degree in Punjabi in 1951 from Khalsa College, Amritsar . During this period of two decades, he remained dedicated to various administrative jobs as well as studying the works of renowned authors. After 1951, he took over the teaching assignments in his alma mater which he carried on till 1971. Then he shifted to Jalandhar and Kapurthala to work as Principal in degree colleges. Under the spur of a never satiating urge for learning till last breath, he earned his doctorate degree in 1976 from Punjabi University, Patiala.

Writing
Creativity being his main occupation, he was honoured with many of the prestigious and coveted state awards and gold medals in recognition of his ever living meritorious literary writings related to every walk of life – social, economic, religious and political. His pen portrayed poetry, story writing, one-act and full-time plays, literary criticism, biographies and literature for children. He wrote radio plays; and he wrote in Hindi and Urdu as well. His special tribute to the Guru was made in his plays sab kichh hote upaey, (1966), Nanak rah pachhaney seiy, and jin sach palley hoey (1969–70) - to mention a few.

External links 
 Works of Gurdial Singh Phul at Open Library
Dramas Written :
1) Jin Sach Palle Hoye
2) Asi Doon Swaye Hoye
3) Bank
4) Cho Aje Nahi Sukka
5) Eh Lahoo Kisda 
6) Kehni te Karni
7) Na dhuppe na chaawein
8) Mele ayiyan tinn jeniya
9) Bapu maala na laahi & many more

 https://books.google.com/books?id=zB4n3MVozbUC&pg=PA1519&lpg=PA1519&dq=gurdial+singh+phull&source=bl&ots=OC4W13WvYU&sig=POJWi27HMAIoewFi42DjJ6nwQis&hl=en&sa=X&ved=0ahUKEwi22YSC9azRAhXJKo8KHaYSBQAQ6AEIZjAP#v=onepage&q=gurdial%20singh%20phull&f=false

References 

Indian male dramatists and playwrights
1911 births
1989 deaths
20th-century Indian dramatists and playwrights
Punjabi University alumni
People from Jalandhar district
Dramatists and playwrights from Punjab, India
20th-century Indian male writers